Alnetoidia is a genus of true bugs belonging to the family Cicadellidae.

The species of this genus are found in Europe and Japan.

Species:
 Alnetoidia alneti (Dahlbom, 1850) 
 Alnetoidia awla Song, 2010

References

Cicadellidae
Hemiptera genera